Norsemen is a Norwegian comedy television series about a group of Vikings living in the village of Norheim around the year 790. It originally premiered in Norway under the name Vikingane (The Vikings) on NRK1 in October 2016. It is produced for NRK by Viafilm. The series is written and directed by Jon Iver Helgaker and Jonas Torgersen.

The series is filmed in the village of Avaldsnes in Karmøy municipality, Rogaland, Norway, and it was recorded simultaneously in both Norwegian and English-language versions by filming each scene twice.

 The first season of the English version was made available on Netflix in August 2017 under the name Norsemen, and season two was made available in October 2018.
 The second season was filmed in early 2017.
 The third season is named 'Season 0', as it tells the story that led up to Season 1.

In September 2020, it was announced that the show had been canceled and would not return for a fourth season.

Synopsis
Norsemen takes place in 790s Norway, with various characters taking leading roles as the series develops. The story covers the life of Vikings in the village of Norheim, with day-to-day happenings and strife of varying comedic degrees. As the series progresses, disputes with neighboring villages, including a rival tribe led by the ruthless Jarl Varg, and the efforts of a Roman slave, Rufus, to modernize Norheim's culture, result in ongoing conflicts.

Cast and characters
 Henrik Mestad as Chieftain Olav, the leader of the village. He finds a route to sail west, and is in possession of a much-coveted map.
 Marian Saastad Ottesen as Hildur, Olav's wife
 Nils Jørgen Kaalstad as Arvid, the chieftain's second-in-command. He loves to go on raids but he also wants to settle in the village.
 Kåre Conradi as Orm, Olav's closeted homosexual brother and husband of Frøya
 Silje Torp as Frøya, a shield-maiden who joins in on raids and is married to Orm
 Trond Fausa Aurvåg as Rufus, an enslaved actor from Rome who befriends Orm and plans to modernize the village
 Øystein Martinsen as Kark, a freed slave who has voluntarily returned to his life as a slave after being institutionalized
 Jon Øigarden as Jarl Varg, the regional overlord and main antagonist of the show
 Kristine Riis as Liv, Arvid's gold digger wife
 Bjørn Myrene as Torstein Hund, Varg's right-hand man
 Mikkel Bratt Silset as Ragnar, Arvid's right-hand man
 André Eriksen as Ørn, a local Viking 
 Thorbjørn Harr as Jarl Bjørn, Varg's former friend, turned enemy

Episodes

Season 1 (2016)

Season 2 (2017)

Season 3 (2020)

Reception and awards
The first season averaged more than one million viewers in Norway, a country with a population of a little over five million.

The New York Times called Norsemen one of the 10 best international TV series in 2017, and one of the best international TV shows of the decade. The Guardian ranked Norsemen the 29th best TV show of 2017.

Norwegian writer Marie Kleve praised the parody violence and how it reflects stories from our time while the characters are living in the Viking era.

The Guardian gave the show a glowing review, and described it as "Monty Python meets Game of Thrones."

The first season of Norsemen won the Gullruten award in 2017 for Best Comedy Show, and it was also nominated for Best Sound Production (Peter Clausen and Erling Rein). The second season was also nominated, and season 3 won the Gullruten award in 2020 for Best Comedy Show, while Bjørn Myrene was nominated for Best Supporting Actor.

References

External links
 
 Norsemen on NRK
 

Television series set in the Viking Age
2016 Norwegian television series debuts
Television shows set in Norway
NRK original programming
Norwegian comedy television series
2010s Norwegian television series
Television series set in the 8th century